Rubin Singer is an American fashion designer. He is a Vienna-born, Paris-raised, New York-based American. SInger lives and works in New York City.

Singer has worked-with and created-for,  an extensive list of A list artists including Shakira, Iman jennifer lopez, Cardi B, Ariana Grande, Taylor Swift, Glenn Close, Mariah Carey, Zendaya, Kate Walsh and Alicia Keys
.    His costumes for Beyoncé featured in the Super Bowl half-time show on February 3, 2013. Rubin Singer and his works have been addressed hundreds of articles in the press.

Singer continued a dynasty of Russian fashion. He was the son of immigrants from the USSR who after departing the Soviet Union first settled in Paris, and then in New York. His father, Alex Singer, is a third-generation designer; he designed costumes for the Bolshoi Theater and Stanislavsky theatre. His grandfather and namesake Rubin Singer created clothes for the highest officials of the USSR, including Stalin.

Singer mastered the profession in the care of his father, then went to study at Central Saint Martins in London. He then began working in New York. There he worked as an associate designer in Oscar de la Renta. Then Bill Blass scouted him and hired Singer for head designer position for Blass' three licensees. Then Singer became head designer at Kai Milla company, named after the wife of Stevie Wonder and that created the company. After two years at Kai Milla and launch of the company Singer left and focused on creating his own collection. Singer debuted with his collection during the New York Fashion Week in 2007 and has since created over 90 Women’s couture and ready to wear clothing collections.

References

External links 
 Rubin Singer's website
 Rubin Singer Blog by Blog and Social Media Master Carlos Melia
 NEW YORKERS & CO.; The Singer Touch, Father to Son

American fashion designers
Living people
American people of Russian descent
1978 births